V Film is a group of premium movie channels broadcasting in the Nordic countries owned by Viaplay Group.

History
Viasat Film was started by Kinnevik on 27 August 1989 as TV1000, using one of the sixteen transponders on Astra 1A, the very first Astra satellite.

In June 1991 TV1000 announced that they channel would merge with another pay movie channel called SF Succé. This gave the channel a content boost with several Swedish films. It also made TV1000 more able to compete with FilmNet which was the leading premium channel at the time.

The merger took place on 1 September 1991. The name of the merged channel was initially announced to be "TV1000 Succékanalen", although this was not used on air.

As TV1000 was much larger than SF Succé, Kinnevik would own 75 percent of the new channel, while SF Succé's owners only owned 25 percent. When Kinnevik spun off their media division into the Modern Times Group in 1997, TV1000 wasn't included. Kinnevik were eventually able to buy out the rest of the owners, and TV1000 became a part of MTG in 2000.

In February 1995 a sister channel called TV1000 Cinema, or just "Cinema", launched. Cable distributors were initially hesitant to offer the new channel, which led MTG to close down another channel called FilmMax in November 1995 and trying to replace it with Cinema.

On 15 April 2000, when Viasat launched its digital platform, TV1000 and Cinema got two time-shift channels, each broadcasting the content with one- and two-hour delays.

On 1 September 2004 TV1000 had a major overhaul. Cinema and three of the time-shift channels closed down and were replaced by four themed movie channels. The line-up would then be TV1000, TV1000 Plus One (one hour time-shift of TV1000), TV1000 Family, TV1000 Action, TV1000 Nordic and TV1000 Classic.

In early 2008 TV1000 launched its first high-definition channel. It was called TV1000 HD and is a simulcast of the main TV1000 channel for the Nordic countries.

On 16 February 2009 an eighth TV1000 channel, TV1000 Drama, is launched in Sweden, Denmark, Norway and Finland. At the same time, the other TV1000 channels had their logos replaced by a new design.

The one-hour timeshift of the main TV1000 channel TV1000 Plus One was closed down on 1 August 2010.

On 2 January 2012 it was announced that the TV1000 channels will be rebranded as Viasat Film starting from 3 March 2012 in the Nordic region. TV1000 is still available in Central Europe as TV1000 East.

On April 23, 2014, changed Viasat in their lineup of movie channels, Viasat Film Nordic closed and was replaced by Viasat Film Comedy. The Nordic film will in future be included in the program on the other channels and Viasat Film Action and Viasat Film Classic was reduced transmission time and put forward only in the evening hours while closed to Viasat Film Drama HD. and Viasat Film Action HD began to simulcast with Nat Geo Wild HD in daytime on the Viasat satellite platform.

10 November 2015 changed Viasat back in their lineup of movie channels, Viasat Film Classic and Viasat Film Drama was closed down and replaced by Viasat Film Hits (Which will send new and classic film favorites) and Viasat Series (a pure serial channel with both new and classic series), also was changed during the program on other channels, it returned to again show series and children's programs as they did in the 90s under the brand TV1000, Viasat Film Family withdrawn children's programs from Disney Jr. daytime and Viasat Film Comedy began broadcasting classic comedy series in the daytime, also changed Viasat Film name to Viasat Film Premiere.

In 2018 the TV department of MTG was split off into Nordic Entertainment Group.

Transmission
TV1000 was previously transmitted using D2-MAC and encrypted with the EuroCrypt encryption system. It was available originally via the Astra 1A satellite, and later via the Intelsat 707 satellite (where TV1000 Cinema was also available via the co-located TV-Sat2 satellite).  Today, the Scandinavian version of Viasat Film is transmitted digitally and encrypted in the VideoGuard system (after previously using the Viaccess system that was widely hacked) within the Viasat package on the Astra 4A satellite.

TV1000 CEE

TV1000 East
In March 2003, TV1000 East began broadcasting in Russia, Ukraine, Belarus, Moldova, Kazakhstan, Georgia, Estonia, Latvia and Lithuania. A channel broadcasting only Russian movies called TV1000 Russkoe Kino (ТВ1000 Русское Кино) was launched in October 2005. 
In April 2008 was launched TV1000 Premium. On 1 September 2008 TV1000 Action East was launched.

TV1000 Balkan
TV1000 Balkan was launched on 18 November 2005 in Romania, Bulgaria, Serbia, Croatia, Slovenia, North Macedonia, Bosnia and Herzegovina, Montenegro. The channel aired Swedish erotic films at night until 2015.

TV1000 Poland
TV1000 Poland was launched on March 5, 2007.  The channel closed on January 15, 2013 as become a Polsat Film.

See also
Viasat Series
TV1000 East

References

External links
Viasat Sweden 
TV1000 on MTG's website

1989 establishments in Sweden
Television channels and stations established in 1989
Modern Times Group
Television channels in Sweden
Television stations in Denmark
Television channels in Norway
Television channels in Finland
Movie channels
Television channels in North Macedonia